Obereichstätt is a village in the district of Eichstätt in Bavaria, administratively part of Dollnstein. It is notable mainly for the unexplained annual plague of millipedes which it suffers every autumn. Zoologists have been unable to explain the hordes of arthropods or find their source. The officials recently built a short metal wall to repel the millipedes.

References

Eichstätt (district)